Feelin' Good is a 1972 studio album by Sarah Vaughan, featuring arrangements by Allyn Ferguson, Jack Elliott, Michel Legrand, and Peter Matz.

Track listing
 "And the Feeling's Good" (Norman Gimbel, Charles Fox) - 4:20
 "Just a Little Lovin' Early In the Mornin'" (Barry Mann, Cynthia Weil) - 3:07
 "Alone Again (Naturally)" (Gilbert O'Sullivan) - 4:25
 "Rainy Days and Mondays" (Roger Nichols, Paul Williams) - 3:42
 "Deep In the Night" (Helen Miller, Eve Merriam) - 3:17
 "Run to Me" (Barry Gibb, Robin Gibb, Maurice Gibb) - 3:00
 "Easy Evil" (Alan O'Day) - 3:04
 "Promise Me" (Peter Matz, Carol Hall) - 4:00
 "Take a Love Song" (Donny Hathaway, Nadine McKinnon) - 3:25
 "Greatest Show On Earth" (Jerry Marcellino, Mel Larson) - 3:00
 "When You Think of It" (Robert Allen, Arthur Kent) - 4:00

Personnel
Sarah Vaughan - vocals
Arranger, conductor
Allyn Ferguson - tracks 2, 6, 10
Jack Elliott - tracks 2, 6, 10
Michel Legrand - track 5
Peter Matz - tracks 1, 3, 4, 7, 8, 9

References

Mainstream Records albums
Albums arranged by Ernie Wilkins
Albums arranged by Allyn Ferguson
Albums arranged by Peter Matz
Albums arranged by Michel Legrand
Albums produced by Bob Shad
Sarah Vaughan albums
1974 albums